Yoshi's New Island is a 2014 platform game developed by Arzest and published by Nintendo for the Nintendo 3DS handheld game console. First released in Europe and North America in March 2014, Yoshi's New Island is a retcon of the events of the ending of the 1995 game Super Mario World 2: Yoshi's Island, and is set prior to the events of the 2006 game Yoshi's Island DS.

The gameplay focuses on controlling Yoshi characters who must escort Baby Mario through a series of levels. Like similar Yoshi games, the game features a hand-drawn art style, with level designs and backgrounds stylized as oil paintings, watercolors, and crayon drawings. The game received mixed reviews from critics with criticism for its graphics, art-style, soundtrack and similarity to the SNES original; though the level design and overall charm did attract some praise.

Gameplay

The gameplay is similar to other Yoshi's Island games, involving Yoshi needing to reach the goal at the end of each stage while protecting Baby Mario from enemies by throwing eggs as a weapon, and sometimes transforming into a vehicle. There are six vehicle forms in the game: Hot Air Balloon, Helicopter, Jackhammer, Mine Cart, Bobsled, and Submarine. They are controlled using the console's gyroscope. A new feature to this game are Mega Eggdozers, larger than usual Yoshi eggs, which are able to hit and destroy some obstacles in the way, as well as Metal Eggdozers, which are slightly smaller and roll across terrain. Yoshi obtains these by eating Giant Metal Shy Guys, respectively. In Underwater stages, where Yoshi must walk on the seafloor, is another new addition. If the player is having difficulty completing a stage, Yoshi can obtain Flutter Wings, which allows for indefinite hovering, and Golden Flutter Wings, which give Yoshi invincibility as well.

Plot
Yoshi's New Island takes place immediately following the events of Super Mario World 2: Yoshi's Island, where a stork delivers twins Baby Mario and Baby Luigi to a couple in the Mushroom Kingdom assumed to be their parents. The opening of Yoshi's New Island reveals that the stork had delivered the babies to the wrong couple. The stork reclaims the babies and sets off to locate their real parents, but is ambushed by Kamek in mid-flight. Kamek captures the stork and Baby Luigi, but Baby Mario falls and reunites with the Yoshi clan on Egg Island, a floating island that was conquered by Baby Bowser. Baby Mario can telepathically sense Baby Luigi's location; the Yoshi clan agrees to escort Baby Mario across the island and rescue Baby Luigi. Once Baby Mario and Yoshi make it to Baby Bowser's castle, Baby Bowser wakes up and jumps on Kamek who attempted to get Baby Mario and Yoshi out. When Baby Bowser tries to ride Yoshi, Baby Bowser is defeated. Kamek uses a Giant Magical Hammer to make Baby Bowser gigantic. After defeating Giant Baby Bowser, Yoshi proceeds to rescue the captured stork and save Baby Luigi only to be met by Adult Bowser, who appeared after warping through space and time. After Yoshi defeats Adult Bowser, Kamek once again uses a Giant Magical Hammer to make adult Bowser gigantic. After defeating Adult Bowser, Yoshi once again comes to the stork and Baby Luigi, and the stork delivers Baby Mario and Luigi back to their true home. The moving helping warp pipe, who helped Yoshi throughout the journey, is seen at the end and is revealed to be adult Mario who also travelled back through time and space to help Yoshi to succeed and returns to his own timeline.

Development and release
Yoshi's New Island was developed by Arzest, which consists of key members involved in the development of its predecessor Yoshi's Island DS. Masahide Kobayashi directed the game, and Takashi Tezuka was producer.

The game was announced in a Nintendo Direct presentation in April 2013. Its name was revealed at E3 2013; a trailer of the game was also featured. Yoshi's New Island was released in both North America and Europe on March 14, 2014, and in Australia on March 21. It was released in Japan on July 24, 2014.

Reception

Yoshi's New Island has received mixed reviews, with its familiarity to Yoshi's Island being met with both praise and criticism. Among the most positive reviews came from Joystiq, giving it 4 out of 5 stars, and IGN, giving it a 7.9 out of 10. Giant Bomb's Patrick Klepek was more mixed and rated it 3 out of 5 stars, stating "at its core, Yoshi's New Island is not a bad game. This is an acceptable, middle-of-the-road platformer, and one that I had an OK time with. But it's not particularly memorable until it's ready to say goodbye, and you're given a fleeting, tantalizing glimpse into the game that might have been."

Conversely, Eurogamer's Chris Schilling was more critical. Rating it 4 out 10, Schilling criticized the game's visuals, soundtrack and pacing as well as Arzest themselves, stating that "It's startling that a game so outwardly similar to the Super Nintendo original can be so very inferior." GameSpot's Tom McShea, who rated it 5 out of 10, echoed similar sentiments when discussing how Yoshi's New Islands similarities with Yoshi's Island were more of a hindrance than a boon. McShea further elaborated that while Yoshi's Island DS "had its own problems, it also had an identity" by citing that game's variety of babies and the unique abilities they possessed before concluding that Yoshi's New Island "has no such identity." Many reviewers have criticized the game's soundtrack for the use of the kazoo as a primary instrument.

Despite receiving middling reviews from critics, the game was added to the Nintendo Selects label on October 16, 2015, in Europe, and March 11, 2016, in North America.

The game debuted at number two in the Japanese sales charts, with 58,285 copies sold. By October 2014, it had sold 197,108 copies in Japan. As of December 31, 2020, worldwide sales reached 2.04 million copies, making it the 32nd best-selling game for the Nintendo 3DS.

Notes

References

External links
Yoshi's New Island at Nintendo.com
Official website for North America
Official website for Europe
Official website for Australia
Official website for Japan 

2014 video games
Multiplayer and single-player video games
Nintendo 3DS eShop games
Nintendo 3DS games
Nintendo 3DS-only games
Nintendo Network games
Side-scrolling platform games
Video game sequels
Video games about children
Video games about time travel
Video games developed in Japan
Video games produced by Takashi Tezuka
Video games set on fictional islands
Yoshi video games
Arzest games